Livry-Gargan is a commune in the northeastern suburbs of Paris, France.

History
On 20 May, 1869, a part of the territory of Livry-Gargan was detached and merged with a part of the territory of Clichy-sous-Bois and a small part of the territory of Gagny to create the commune of Le Raincy.

Population

Heraldry

Transport
Livry-Gargan is not served by any station of the Paris Métro, RER, or suburban rail network. The closest station to Livry-Gargan is Sevran – Livry station on Paris RER line B. This station is located in the neighboring commune of Sevran,  from the town center of Livry-Gargan.

Education
Schools include:
 9 preschools
 9 elementary schools
 Junior high schools: LÉON-JOUHAUX, SEGPA du collège, ÉDOUARD-HERRIOT, LUCIE-AUBRAC
 Senior high schools: Lycée André Boulloche, Lycée Henri Sellier

Twin towns
Livry-Gargan is twinned with the communities of:
 Almuñécar, Spain
 Cerveteri, Italy
 Fürstenfeldbruck, Germany
 Haringey, United Kingdom

Personalities
Grégory Arnolin, born in 1980, footballer
 Cassandre Beaugrand, born in 1997, Triathlete
Karim Cheurfi, perpetrator of the 2017 shooting of Paris police officers
Laetitia Avia, born in 1985, politician
Aïssa Laïdouni, born in 1996, footballer

See also
Communes of the Seine-Saint-Denis department

References

External links
Official website (in French)

Communes of Seine-Saint-Denis
Seine-Saint-Denis communes articles needing translation from French Wikipedia